The Cancioneiro da Ajuda ("Ajuda Songbook") is a collection of Galician-Portuguese lyric poems probably dating from the last quarter of the 13th-century. It is the oldest of the Galician-Portuguese cancioneiros with secular music.

Description 
The Cancioneiro is kept in the library of the Ajuda National Palace, a former royal residence located in Lisbon. It consists of a parchment codex written in Gothic script by three hands and containing illuminated miniatures. Both the text and the miniatures remained unfinished and not a note of music was written in the space left for it. The whole codex contains 310 poems, nearly all of them cantigas de amor (male-voiced love songs, though a few are satiric and there are a few male/female dialogs).

History 
The first (crude) edition dates from 1823, but a monumental critical edition, still a standard work, was published by the German-born Romance philologist Carolina Michaëlis de Vasconcellos in 1904. An important paleographic transcription was published by American scholar Henry H. Carter in 1941.

References
 Carter, Henry H. 1941. Cancioneiro da Ajuda. A Diplomatic Edition.  New York-London: Modern Language Association of America/Oxford University Press (rpt Milwood, N.J.: Klaus Reprint Co., 1975; rpt [with an introduction by Maria Ana Ramos] Lisbon: Imprensa Nacional-Casa de Moeda, 2007).
 Lanciani, Giulia and Giuseppe Tavani (edd.). 1993. Dicionário da Literatura Medieval Galega e Portuguesa. Lisbon: Caminho.
 Michaëlis de Vasconcellos, Carolina. 1904. Cancioneiro da Ajuda.  Edição critica e commentada. 2 vols. Halle a.S., Max Niemeyer (rpt com "Glossário" [=Michaëlis 1920], Lisboa: Imprensa Nacional - Casa de Moeda, 1990).
 Michaëlis de Vasconcellos, Carolina. 1920. "Glossário do Cancioneiro da Ajuda". Revista Lusitana 23: 1–95.
 Ramos, M. A. et al.. 1994. Fragmento do Nobiliario do Conde Dom Pedro & Cancioneiro da Ajuda. Edição Fac-similada do códice existente na Biblioteca da Ajuda.  Apresentação, Estudos e Índices.  Lisbon: Edições Tavola Redonda.
 Ramos, Maria Ana, and António Resende de Oliveira. “Cancioneiro da Ajuda”, in Lanciani and Tavani 1993: 115–118.

External links

Article (large) on the Cancioneiro da Ajuda (in Galician).

13th-century books 
13th-century illuminated manuscripts
13th century in music
13th century in Portugal
Chansonniers (books)
Galician language
Galician-Portuguese
Music illuminated manuscripts
Portuguese literature
Portuguese music history